The 1961 San Francisco Giants season was the Giants' 79th year in Major League Baseball, their fourth season in San Francisco since their move from New York following the 1957 season, and their 2nd season at Candlestick Park. The team finished in third place in the National League with an 85 wins and 69 losses  record, eight games behind the NL Champion Cincinnati Reds.  The Giants were managed by Alvin Dark. As of 2021, this remains the only Giants season in franchise history in which two players (Orlando Cepeda and Willie Mays) each hit 40 or more home runs.

Regular season 
Willie Mays had both a three home run game (on June 29) and a four home run game (on April 30) during the 1961 season. Mays became the ninth player, and first Giant, in MLB history to hit four home runs in one game.

Season standings

Record vs. opponents

Opening Day starters 
Felipe Alou
Ed Bressoud
Orlando Cepeda
Tom Haller
Chuck Hiller
Sam Jones
Harvey Kuenn
Willie Mays
Willie McCovey

Roster

Player stats

Batting

Starters by position 
Note: Pos = Position; G = Games played; AB = At bats; H = Hits; Avg. = Batting average; HR = Home runs; RBI = Runs batted in

Other batters 
Note: G = Games played; AB = At bats; H = Hits; Avg. = Batting average; HR = Home runs; RBI = Runs batted in

Pitching

Starting pitchers 
Note: G = Games pitched; IP = Innings pitched; W = Wins; L = Losses; ERA = Earned run average; SO = Strikeouts

Other pitchers 
Note: G = Games pitched; IP = Innings pitched; W = Wins; L = Losses; ERA = Earned run average; SO = Strikeouts

Relief pitchers 
Note: G = Games pitched; W = Wins; L = Losses; SV = Saves; ERA = Earned run average; SO = Strikeouts

Awards and honors 

All-Star Game (first game)
All-Star Game (second game)

Farm system 

LEAGUE CHAMPIONS: Tacoma, Springfield, Quincy

Rio Grande Valley club moved to Victoria, June 10, 1961; Pocatello affiliation shared with Kansas City Athletics

Notes

References 
 1961 San Francisco Giants at Baseball Reference
 1961 San Francisco Giants at Baseball Almanac

San Francisco Giants seasons
San Francisco Giants season
San Fran